Cottus kuznetzovi is a species of freshwater ray-finned fish belonging to the family Cottidae, the typical sculpins. It inhabits the Lena River system in eastern Siberia in Russia. It reaches a maximum length of 9.1 cm.

References

Taxa named by Lev Berg
Fish described in 1903
Fish of Russia
Cottus (fish)